Andrew Bee may refer to:

 Andrew Bee (soldier), American Civil War soldier
 Andrew Bee (cricketer) (born 1965), Scottish cricketer